The 1981 European Championship can refer to European Championships held in several sports:

 1981 European Rugby League Championship
 Eurobasket 1981